Jonathan Chua (born 12 February 1990), better known as Jon Chua JX, is a Singapore-based actor and singer. He is one of the members of Singaporean band The Sam Willows and the co-founder and creative director of Zendyll Records, and managing director of Zendyll Productions.

Career
Chua is a founding member of Singaporean band The Sam Willows, serving as the lead guitarist and vocalist.

In 2015, Jon started Zendyll Productions, a recording studio and sound design company in Singapore, with Evan Low, and in 2018, he launched Zendyll Records, a record label that is focused on artist & repertoire (A&R) creation, as well as creative production.

Chua has been a brand partner for Audi, Hugo and Adidas.

In 2019, Chua was a speaker for All That Matters 2019 alongside Patrick Moxey (Ultra Music) and Ghazi Shami (Empire Distribution).

Chua made his solo debut July 25, 2019 with the single "Ready For Ya", featuring Flannel Albert. The music video was also released on the same day.

Personal life
Chua was born and raised in Singapore. He attended Anglo-Chinese Junior College, and majored in Sociology in Nanyang Technological University. He got engaged to Astro SuperSport TV presenter Amanda Chaang in December 2017, and they got married in late June 2018. In 2022, they are currently expecting their first child. They own two Dachshunds named Chilli and Salsa. Chua cites Pharrell Williams as his role model.

Filmography

Movies

Discography

Singles

External links

 at The Sam Willows Band
 at Zendyll Records

References

1990 births
Living people
Jazz fusion drummers
21st-century drummers
The Sam Willows members
21st-century Singaporean male singers